Mohammed bin Nasser Al-Ajmi (Arabic:محمد بن ناصر العجمي) is a Kuwaiti writer and book investigator. Mohammed Al-Ajmi is best known for investigating books written by Al-Sham writers and scholars, as he has investigated dozens of books throughout his career in the world of publishing.

Career 
Mohammed bin Nasser Al-Ajmi has written and investigated dozens of books throughout his career, perhaps the most notable is “Investigation of the book of Noor Al-Iqtibat in Mechanism of the Will of the Prophet, may God’s prayers and peace be upon him, by Ibn Abbas to Ibn Rajab”.There is also the book “Among the houses of knowledge in Damascus are the Al-Qasimi family their brilliance in knowledge and achievement” which was published by Al-Bashaer Islamic house (Arabic: Dar Al-Bashaer Al-Islamiyyah) with 264 pages, where the author deals with the famous scientific houses in Damascus that produced a number of scholars and writers. He focused on Al-Khatib whose scholars inherited the ability to use rhetoric speech, at the Umayyad Mosque.Bin Kuzbari, who were famous for the science of prophetic talk (hadith) and how they honored it and taught it under the dome of the Umayyad Mosque. Al-Oustwani who have taken over Damascus judiciary. Banu Abidine family, the teachers of Hanafi jurisprudence. Al-Shati who are special for their knowledge on Hanbali jurisprudence and the science of inheritance. Banu Al-Attar famous for their sciences. Banu Al-Bitar who from them came generations of scholars and poets. Al-Halwani who were the sheikhs of the readers and other ancient scholar families in Damascus, some whose ancestors remain. In a number of its chapters, the book focuses on the Al-Qasimi whom the writer describes as the house of science and literature with an honorably high scholar status. In the family, the writer focuses more on Imam Mohammed Jamal Al-Din Al-Qasimi who was known in his time as one of the leaders of the last century’s science and reform campaign in Syria.

In the book, Mohammed mentioned a brief profile on Al-Qasimi family members,he arranged them as follows: Qasim Al-Halaq whom to which Al-Qasimi is attributed, Sons of Qasim Al-Halaq, Mohammed Saeed Al-Qasimi, Abdul Rahman Al-Qasimi, Mohammed Al-Qasimi and his children, Abdul Ghani and his children.  Al-Ajmi mentioned three sequels in his book: First: Models of Sheikh Mohammed Saeed Al-Qasimi’s line and headings of some of his books. Second: About the lineage of Sheikh Mohammed Al-Qasimi on his mother’s side. Third: Models of his poetry. Al-Ajmi also issued a book “Arabic title: Waleed Al-Qoron Al-Mushriqa, Imam Al-Sham Fi Asrh, Jamal Al-Din Al-Qasimi”In it, the writer speaks of Mohammed Jamal Al-Din Abu Al-Faraj Bin Mohammed bin Qasim bin Saleh Bin Ismael Bin Labi-Bakir known as Al-Qasimi, who was the Imam of his time. The author details how he grew up in a scientific family that cares about the sciences, religion and literature and is credited for it- and for other factors- with what he calls Al-Qasimi excellence and ranked it highly. In this book, Al-Ajimi recounted the details of Al-Qasimi’s life and went through almost every stage of his life from birth to childhood, adolescence, career, death, and legacy.

Al-Ajmi published a book titled “AlSham’s Sign Abdul Qadir bin Badran Al-Damshi’s Life and Relics” (Arabic title: Alamat AlSham Abdul Qadir bin Bdraan Al-Dimashqi Hayateh w Atharh). It’s the book known as “The sign” (Arabic: Al-Alamah) for Abdul Qadir bin Badran Al-Dimashqi, a 14th- century scholar,he was one of the venerable scholars- according to Al-Ajmi- those who have taken from science with great luck. However, he was hurt by his generation and time, they did not know his value and took him for granted, but he held out until his reputationfaded. Abdul Qadir has written dozens of literatures in the Islamic hadith and jurisprudence and history besides that from other arts.

Among Al-Ajmi’s books is “Damascus scholar Sheikh Abdul Razaq Al-Bitar; His life and Achievements” (Arabic title: Adeeb Olama Dimashq AlSheikh Abdul Razaq Al-Bitar; Hayateh wa Ingazateh), where he talked about the historian and scholar who was a prominent scholar of his time and of his countryand about him being a reader and poet. In the last years of his life, Abdul Razaq Al-Bitar, according to the book by Mohammed bin Nasser Al-Ajmi, he became one of the leading advocates of reform and he was daring to say the truth without favors. Al-Ajmi published the book “Kuwait’s Sign Sheikh Abdullah Al-Khalaf Al-Dahyan; his life, scientific correspondence and effects” (Arabic title: Alamat Al-Kuwait AlSheikh Abdullah Al-Kalaf Al-Dahyan; hayateh wa muraslat’h Al-ilmyah wa athareh) in it, he spoke about the scholar Abdullah Al-Kalaf Al-Dahyan, who died in 1349A.H, and his visible impact on the revival of science in Kuwait and associating students with the religious sciences, as well as the revival of the study of the ancestor’s books. Mohammed bin Nasser Al-Ajmi addressed many important aspects of Al-Dahyan’s life, focusing on his interest in science and books and his correspondences with the great scholars of his time.Chapter one is concerned with his name, descent, origin and pursuit for education, journey to pilgrimage, manners, qualities, his da’wa (call for the imamte), judiciary, the praise of scholars for him. Chapter two speaks of his working council and pupils, his library and its anecdotes, models of his library, manuscripts that were printed or verified from his library, the money of his library. Chapter three introduced his scientific benefits on manuscripts, his possession of books and his standing for them. Chapter four is devoted for the scientific correspondence between him and the great scholars. Chapter five is devoted to his correspondence to shcolars, and his friendly communications with his friends. Chapter six is for his letters to his nephew Ahmed Kameas. Chapter seven presents his poetry and writing, his descendants, his death. The eighth and final chapter mentioned the elegies about him.

Works 
This is a list of his most notable works:
 The audible forty Hanbali.
 Damascus scholar Sheikh Abdul Razaq Al-Bitar; His life and Achievements.
 A notebook of the scholar Ibn Badran Al-Dimashqi.
 The scholar and historian sheikh Zuhair Al-Shawaish and his Al-Shawish treasury.
 The secret of seeking forgiveness after prayers.
 (Arabic title: Waleed Al-Qoron Al-Mushriqa, Imam Al-Sham Fi Asrh, Jamal Al-Din Al-Qasimi).
 Pages in the translation of Imam Al-Safarini.
 Kuwait’s Sign Sheikh Abdullah Al-Khalaf Al-Dahyan; his life, scientific correspondence and effects.
 The Al-Qasimi family and their brilliance in knowledge and achievement.
 The last of Al-Qasimi’s light, Sheikh Mohammed Saeed Al-Qasimi.
 Articles and Memories in the Sheikh of Hadith, the scholar Mohmmed Yunus Al-Gunfouri, a lover and commentator on Sahih Al-Bukhari.
 The sign of Al-Sham Abdul Qadir bin Badran Al-Dimashqi, his life and effects.
 Forty on the Virtue of Mosques and their Architecture.
 Investigation of the book of Noor Al-Iqtibat in Mechanism of the Will of the Prophet, may God’s prayers and peace be upon him, by Ibn Abbas to Ibn Rajab.
 The book of jurisprudence rules and their explanation.

References 

Arab writers
Kuwaiti writers